Crash and Burn may refer to:

TV and film
Crash 'n' Burn (1977 film), about Toronto, Canada's first punk club
Crash and Burn (documentary), a 2016 documentary about motor racing driver Tommy Byrne
Crash and Burn (1990 film), a 1990 low budget sci-fi movie
Crash and Burn (2008 film)
Cra$h & Burn, a Canadian television series
"Crash and Burn" (CSI episode)
"Crash and Burn" (Entourage), a television episode
CrashBurn (2003), Australian TV miniseries

Music

Albums
 Crash and Burn (Bombay Rockers album), 2007
 Crash and Burn (John Foxx album), 2003
 Crash and Burn (Pat Travers Band album), 1980
 Crash & Burn (album), by Traci Braxton, 2014

Songs
 "Crash and Burn" (Jan Leyers song), 2003
 "Crash and Burn" (Nadia Ali song), 2008
 "Crash and Burn" (Savage Garden song), 2000
 "Crash and Burn" (Thomas Rhett song), 2015
 "Crash & Burn" (Basshunter song), 2013
 "Crash and Burn", from the April Wine album The Nature of the Beast, 1981 
 "Crash and Burn", from the Bangles album Everything, 1988
 "Crash and Burn", from the Bea Miller album Aurora, 2018
 "Crash and Burn", original title of "You Said No", by Busted, 2003
 "Crash and Burn", from the Lifehouse album Smoke & Mirrors, 2010
 "Crash and Burn", by Maggie Lindemann, 2021
 "Crash & Burn", from the Pink album I'm Not Dead, 2006
 "Crash and Burn", from the Sheryl Crow album The Globe Sessions, 1998
 "Crash and Burn", from the Simple Plan video album A Big Package for You, 2003
 "Crash & Burn", from the Sugababes album Sweet 7, 2010
 "Crash and Burn", from the Yngwie J. Malmsteen album The Seventh Sign, 1984

Other uses
Crash N Burn (1993 video game), for 3DO
Crash 'n' Burn (2004 video game), for Xbox and PlayStation 2
Crash and Burn (book), a memoir by American comedian Artie Lange

See also
Crash & Bernstein, a Disney XD comedy
"Crash and Burn Girl", a 2005 song by Robyn